Aberhafesp is a small village and community in Montgomeryshire, Powys, Wales. The hamlet of Bwlch-y-Ffridd is within the community.

It is situated about five miles west of Newtown on the B4568 close to the River Severn.

The church of St Gwynog dates back to the 13th century but was largely rebuilt in 1857.

References

External links 
Photos of Aberhafesp and surrounding area on geograph

Villages in Powys
Communities in Powys